This is a list of the National Register of Historic Places listings in Coke County, Texas.

This is intended to be a complete list of properties and districts listed on the National Register of Historic Places in Coke County, Texas. There are one district and one individual property listed on the National Register in the county.

Current listings

The locations of National Register properties and districts may be seen in a mapping service provided.

|}

See also

National Register of Historic Places listings in Texas
Recorded Texas Historic Landmarks in Coke County

References

External links

Coke County, Texas
Coke County
Buildings and structures in Coke County, Texas